Alfred Vogel (26 October 1902 – 1 October 1996) was a Swiss herbalist, naturopath and writer.

Life

Alfred Vogel was born in 1902 in Aesch, Basel, Switzerland. At the age of 21, he moved to Basel to manage a health store. In 1927, he married Sophie Sommer; together they had two daughters. In 1929, he started publishing a monthly magazine, Das Neue Leben ("the new life"). From 1941 this became A. Vogel Gesundheits-Nachrichten ("health news").

In the 1930s, Vogel relocated to Teufen in Appenzell. Vogel was an avid traveller and enjoyed visiting new countries and meeting new cultures. He was especially interested in meeting indigenous peoples in a close relationship with nature. From the 1950s onward, he travelled extensively through Africa, North America, Oceania, and South America.

On one of his travels he met and stayed with the Sioux in the United States. The story goes that he befriended Ben Black Elk, son of medicine man Nicholas Black Elk, who Vogel says, taught him about the Native American herbal tradition. However, Ben Black Elk was known to be merely earning his bread as an actor by having taken pictures of him with tourists near Mount Rushmore for money, also starring in the 1962 film How the West Was Won. Upon Vogel's departure, Ben Black Elk allegedly gave him a farewell present: a handful of seeds of  Echinacea purpurea (purple coneflower). Back in Switzerland, Vogel began cultivating and researching the plant, eventually creating Echinaforce, that would become his flagship product.

In 1963, Vogel established Bioforce AG in Roggwil in Thurgau, Switzerland. He died in 1996 in Feusisberg at the age of 93.

Criticism 
For years, Alfred Vogel was known as doctor A. Vogel or dr. Vogel. Vogel allegedly received an honorary doctorate in botanical studies in 1952 from the California University of Liberal Physicians in Los Angeles, allowing him to style himself "dr.h.c. A. Vogel". That institute was dissolved long ago, and the legitimacy of its diplomas is disputed; nowadays, some blank CULP diplomas are on display at the Museum of Questionable Medical Devices, originally in the American Medical Association's quackery museum. Because he was not a physician, but did sell 'natural medicines', the title dr. Vogel implied an invalid association. After a complaint in 1981 at the Dutch Advertising Standards Authority, he and his products were gradually no longer called dr. Vogel. On 14 October 1982, Dutch teacher, presenter and comedian  published an article in the science section of NRC Handelsblad on this matter, in which he branded Vogel a quack.

Alfred Vogel was a member of Jehovah's Witnesses. Vogel propagated some doctrines of Jehovah's Witnesses in his book Der kleine Doktor (Published in English as "The Nature Doctor"). In older editions, for example, one can read that God prohibited blood transfusion, and that applying this medical treatment could lead to a change in character.

During a November 2014 episode of the satirical television show Zondag met Lubach, Vogel's "invention" of Echinaforce was criticised and mocked.

Selected publications 

 Kleiner Wegweiser für die Lebensreform ("How to Reform Your Life") (1926)
 Die Nahrung als Heilfaktor ("Nature as a Healing Factor")  (1935)
 Der kleine Doktor ("The Nature Doctor") (1952)
 Die Leber als Regulator der Gesundheit ("The Liver as a Regulator of Health") (1960)
 Gesundheitsführer durch südliche Länder ("Health Guide to Southern Countries") (1972)
 Krebs - Schicksal oder Zivilisationskrankheit? ("Cancer - Fate or the Disease of Civilisation") (1982)

References

External links
 www.avogel.ch

1902 births
1996 deaths
Herbalists
Naturopaths
People from Basel-Landschaft
Swiss writers in German